Astridia is a genus of plants in the family Aizoaceae. It is named after the wife Astrid of the German botanist and archaeologist Gustav Schwantes (1881 - 1960).

Species include:

 Astridia dinteri L.Bolus
 Astridia hallii L.Bolus

References

 
Aizoaceae genera
Taxonomy articles created by Polbot
Taxa named by Kurt Dinter